Below is a list of the 25 members of the European Parliament for the Netherlands in the 1984 to 1989 session.

Party representation

Mutations

1984 
 14 June: Election for the European Parliament in the Netherlands.
 24 July: Begin 2nd European Parliament session. (1984–1989)

1986 
 28 October: Yvonne van Rooy (CDA) leaves the European Parliament, because he became an undersecretary in the Second Lubbers cabinet.
 5 November: Jim Janssen van Raaij (CDA) is installed in the European Parliament as a replacement for Yvonne van Rooy.
 16 December: Herman Verbeek (GPA)  leaves the European Parliament.

1987 
 31 January: Nel van Dijk (GPA) is installed in the European Parliament as a replacement for Herman Verbeek.

List

| style="text-align:left;" colspan="11" | 
|-
! Name
! Sex
! National party
! EP Group
! Period
! Preference vote
|-align=left
| Hedy d'Ancona
| Female
|  Labour Party
|  SOC
| 24 July 1984 – 7 November 1989
|
|-align=left
| Bouke Beumer
| Male
|  Christian Democratic Appeal
|  EPP
| 17 July 1979 – 19 July 1994
|
|-align=left
| Elise Boot
| Male
|  Christian Democratic Appeal
|  EPP
| 17 July 1979 – 24 July 1989
|
|-align=left
| Bob Cohen
| Male
|  Labour Party
|  SOC
| 17 July 1979 – 24 July 1989
|
|-align=left
| Pam Cornelissen
| Male
|  Christian Democratic Appeal
|  EPP
| 24 July 1984 – 20 July 1999
|
|-align=left
| Piet Dankert
| Male
|  Labour Party
|  SOC
| 17 July 1979 – 7 November 1989
|
|-align=left
| Nel van Dijk
| Female
|  Communist Party of the Netherlands
|  RBW
| January 1987 – 1 September 1998
|
|-align=left
| Ien van den Heuvel-de Blank
| Female
|  Labour Party
|  SOC
| 17 July 1979 – 24 July 1989
|
|-align=left
| Jim Janssen van Raaij
| Male
|  Christian Democratic Appeal
|  EPP
| 17 July 1979 – 24 July 1984October 1986 – 20 July 1999
| 
|-align=left
| Jessica Larive
| Female
|  People's Party for Freedom and Democracy
|  LD
| 24 July 1984 – 20 July 1999
|
|-align=left
| Bram van der Lek
| Male
|  Pacifist Socialist Party
|  RBW
| 24 July 1984 – 24 July 1989
|
|-align=left
| Hendrik Jan Louwes
| Male
|  People's Party for Freedom and Democracy
|  LD
| 17 July 1979 – 24 July 1989
|
|-align=left
| Hanja Maij-Weggen
| Female
|  Christian Democratic Appeal
|  EPP
| 17 July 1979 – 6 November 1989
|
|-align=left
| Alman Metten
| Male
|  Labour Party
|  SOC
| 24 July 1984 – 20 July 1999
|
|-align=left
| Hemmo Muntingh
| Male
|  Labour Party
|  SOC
| 17 July 1979 – 19 July 1994
|
|-align=left
| Hans Nord
| Male
|  People's Party for Freedom and Democracy
|  LD
| 17 July 1979 – 24 July 1989
|
|-align=left
| Jean Penders
| Male
|  Christian Democratic Appeal
|  EPP
| 17 July 1979 – 19 July 1994
|
|-align=left
| Yvonne van Rooy
| Female
|  Christian Democratic Appeal
|  EPP
| 24 July 1984 – 28 October 1986
|
|-align=left
| Teun Tolman
| Male
|  Christian Democratic Appeal
|  EPP
| 17 July 1979 – 24 July 1989
|
|-align=left
| Herman Verbeek
| Male
|  Political Party of Radicals
|  RBW
| 24 July 1984 – December 1986
|
|-align=left
| Wim Vergeer
| Male
|  Christian Democratic Appeal
|  EPP
| 17 July 1979 – 24 July 1989
|
|-align=left
| Phili Viehoff
| Female
|  Labour Party
|  SOC
| December 1979 – 24 July 1989
|
|-align=left
| Ben Visser
| Male
|  Labour Party
|  SOC
| 24 July 1984 – 19 July 1994
|
|-align=left
| Gijs de Vries
| Male
|  People's Party for Freedom and Democracy
|  LD
| 24 July 1984 – 2 August 1998
|
|-align=left
| Leen van der Waal
| Male
|  Political Reformed Party
|  NI
| 24 July 1984 – 2 September 1997
|
|-align=left
| Florus Wijsenbeek
| Male
|  People's Party for Freedom and Democracy
|  LD
| 24 July 1984 – 20 July 1999
|
|-align=left
| Eisso Woltjer
| Male
|  Labour Party
|  SOC
| 17 July 1979 – 19 July 1994
|
|-style="background-color:#dcdcdc"
| style="text-align:left;" colspan="6" |Source:
|-
|}

By party

On the Labour Party list: (SOC)

 Hedy d'Ancona
 Bob Cohen
 Piet Dankert (top candidate)
 Ien van den Heuvel-de Blank
 Alman Metten
 Hemmo Muntingh
 Ben Visser
 Phili Viehoff
 Eisso Woltjer

On the Christian Democratic Appeal list: (EPP)

 Bouke Beumer (top candidate)
 Elise Boot
 Yvonne van Rooy (replaced by: Jim Janssen van Raaij)
 Pam Cornelissen
 Hanja Maij-Weggen
 Jean Penders
 Teun Tolman
 Wim Vergeer
 Jim Janssen van Raaij

On the People's Party for Freedom and Democracy list: (LD)

 Hans Nord (top candidate)
 Jessica Larive
 Hendrik Jan Louwes
 Gijs de Vries
 Florus Wijsenbeek

On the Green Progressive Accord list: (RBW)

 Bram van der Lek (PSP) (top candidate)
 Herman Verbeek (PPR) (replaced by: Nel van Dijk)
 Nel van Dijk (CPN)

On the SGP, RPF and GPV list: (NI)

 Leen van der Waal (SGP) (top candidate)

References 

Netherlands
List
1984